Kenneth Franzheim was an architect in Chicago and Boston in the early 1920s with C. Howard Crane. He started an independent practice in New York in 1925 and specialized in the design of large commercial buildings and airports. 

Franzheim became a major commercial architect in mid-century Houston after moving his offices to the city in 1937. Franzheim was one of the architects involved designing Humble Tower, the Prudential Building (Houston), Texas National Bank building (Houston) and Bank of the Southwest (Houston) building. His best-known building was the Foley’s Department Store downtown location (demolished). It had six floors before it was expanded to nine in 1957, and included windowless retail space suspended at street level above a first-floor window-wall and canopy with a streamlined interior by famed industrial designer Raymond Loewy.  In 1950 the building received an Award of Merit from the AIA. Franzheim also designed 275 Madison Avenue and several other buildings in New York City.

John Zemanek and Eugene Werlin worked at the firm early in their careers. There are plans to add oral interviews with both Zemanek and Werlin in which they discuss Franzheim’s influence to the digital library at the University of Houston.

One of Franzheim's most enduring legacies is the development of Fairlington in Arlington, VA.  Franzheim was the primary architect of this WW2-era housing development a few miles south of the Pentagon, which is today a high-end, private housing development.

Prudential / HMB building

The Houston Main Building (HMB) formerly the Prudential Building, was a skyscraper in the Texas Medical Center, Houston, Texas. It originally housed offices of the Prudential Insurance Company, before becoming a part of the MD Anderson Cancer Center. The building was demolished on January 8, 2012.

References

External links
 Franzheim, Kenneth - Handbook of Texas

20th-century American architects
Architects from Houston